Lough Meela is a freshwater lake in the northwest of Ireland. It is located in The Rosses area of County Donegal.

Geography

Natural history
Fish species in Lough Meela include sea trout, brown trout and flounder. The lake is part of The Rosses Fishery.

See also
List of loughs in Ireland

References

Meela